The meteorological history of Hurricane Andrew, the strongest tropical cyclone of the 1992 Atlantic hurricane season, lasted from mid to late August 1992. The hurricane developed from a tropical wave that moved off the coast of Africa on August 14. Tracking westward due to a ridge, favorable conditions allowed it to develop into Tropical Depression Three on August 16 in the deep tropical Atlantic Ocean. The cyclone gradually intensified, becoming a tropical storm on August 17. However, wind shear soon impacted the storm, causing significant increases in barometric pressure and nearly destroying its low-level circulation by August 20. Wind shear sharply decreased starting on August 21, and with warm sea surface temperatures, Andrew began rapid deepening, starting on the following day. By August 23, Andrew peaked as a Category 5 hurricane on the Saffir–Simpson hurricane wind scale while approaching The Bahamas.

The cyclone weakened slightly before making landfall on Eleuthera later that day and the Berry Islands early on August 24. However, the storm then rapidly, but briefly restrengthened into a Category 5 hurricane, and was at that intensity when it struck Elliott Key and just south of Homestead, Florida on August 24. Andrew weakened while crossing Florida, but only reduced to a Category 4 hurricane while it emerged into the Gulf of Mexico. The storm re-intensified slightly in the Gulf, causing it to maintain its status as a Category 4 hurricane. Early on August 26, Andrew weakened slightly to a low-end Category 3 hurricane before making landfall near Morgan City, Louisiana. Once inland, the cyclone rapidly weakened, and less than 24 hours after landfall, Andrew was merely a tropical depression. It continued northeastward across the Southern United States, becoming extratropical on August 28, before merging with a frontal system on August 29, while centered over the southern Appalachian Mountains.

Origins

A tropical wave moved off the coast of Africa on August 14. Under the influence of a ridge of high pressure to its north, the wave tracked quickly westward. An area of convection developed along the wave axis to the south of the Cape Verde islands, and on August 15 meteorologists began classifying the system with the Dvorak technique. The thunderstorm activity became more concentrated, and narrow spiral rainbands developed around a developing center of circulation.

Initially, moderate wind shear prevented strengthening, though a decrease in shear allowed the depression to intensify into Tropical Storm Andrew at around 1200 UTC on August 17. Shortly thereafter the thunderstorms decreased markedly during the diurnal minimum, and as the storm turned to the northwest increased southwesterly wind shear from an upper-level low prevented Andrew from maintaining deep convection.

On August 19, a Hurricane Hunters flight into the storm failed to locate a well-defined center, and the next day a flight found that the cyclone had degenerated to the extent that only a diffuse low-level circulation center remained; observations indicated the pressure rose to an unusually high 1015 mbar. The flight indicated Andrew maintained a vigorous circulation aloft, with winds of  recorded at flight level. Subsequently, the upper-level low weakened and split into a trough, which decreased the wind shear over the storm. Simultaneously, a strong high pressure cell developed over the southeastern United States, which built eastward and caused Andrew to turn to the west. Convection became more organized as upper-level outflow became better established.

Bahamas and Florida

The hurricane accelerated as it tracked due westward into an area of very favorable conditions, and late on August 22 began rapidly intensifying; in a 24‑hour period the pressure dropped 47 mbar to a minimum pressure of 922 mbar.

As it crossed over the warm waters of the Gulf Stream in the Straits of Florida, the hurricane rapidly re-intensified, as the eye decreased in size and its eyewall convection deepened. About 25 minutes after its first Florida landfall, Andrew hit just northeast of Homestead with a slightly lower pressure of 922 mbar.

As the eye moved onshore Florida, the convection in the eyewall strengthened, owing to increased convergence, and Hurricane Hunters reported a warmer eyewall temperature than two hours prior.

Final landfall and dissipation

In the Gulf of Mexico, the eye remained well-defined as the hurricane turned to the west-northwest, a change due to the weakening of the ridge to its north. As the high pressure system to its north weakened, a strong mid-latitude trough approached the area from the northwest. This caused the hurricane to decelerate to the northwest, and winds decreased as Andrew approached the Gulf Coast of the United States.

Hurricane Andrew weakened rapidly as it turned to the north and northeast, and within ten hours weakened to a tropical storm. After entering Mississippi, the cyclone deteriorated to tropical depression status early on August 27. Accelerating northeastward, the tropical depression began merging with the approaching frontal system, and by midday on August 28, Andrew ceased to meet the qualifications of a tropical cyclone while located over the southern Appalachian Mountains. The remnants continued to the northeast and began losing its identity within the frontal zone over the Mid-Atlantic states, merging with another frontal system and the remnants of Hurricane Lester on August 29, over Pennsylvania.

Reanalysis and statistics

In 2002, the Atlantic Basin Hurricane Database Reanalysis Project examined Hurricane Andrew and this corridor of extreme winds embedded within Andrew's northern eyewall. The project concluded that Category 5 conditions on land occurred only in a small region of southern Dade (now Miami-Dade) County, specifically close to the coast in Cutler Ridge. The remaining areas affected by Andrew's initial landfall in Florida likely experienced sustained Category 4 and 3 hurricane conditions. Andrew was officially re-classified as a Category 5 storm in 2004, and the reanalysis provided a more comprehensive and detailed examination of Andrew's wind field structure upon landfall than originally assessed in 1992.

Andrew's peak winds in South Florida were not directly measured, primarily because of the destruction or failure of measuring instruments. It is probable that higher winds occurred at Fowey Rocks after the station was destroyed. The highest recorded surface gust, within Andrew's northern eyewall, occurred at the home of a resident about a mile from the shoreline in Perrine, Florida. Subsequent wind-tunnel testing at Clemson University of the same type of anemometer revealed a 16.5% error. The observed value was officially corrected to be .

Another important wind speed report came from the Kendall-Tamiami Executive Airport, located nine miles (14 km) west of the shoreline. While weather observations had been suspended at the station, the official weather observer there stayed on duty and continued to make wind speed readings. At 4:45 a.m. EDT, August 24, he noted that the wind speed indicator was "pegged" at a position a little beyond the instrument's highest value of 100 kt (115 mph; 185 km/h), at a point he estimated to be around 110 kt (127 mph; 204 km/h). The needle reportedly remained "fixed" at this location for 3–5 minutes before dropping to "0" when the anemometer failed. These observations were closely corroborated by two other observers. He also indicated that the weather conditions continued to worsen for an additional 30 minutes after the anemometer failed. It is probable that much stronger winds occurred at this location.

See also

List of Category 5 Atlantic hurricanes
Timeline of the 1992 Atlantic hurricane season
Meteorological history of Hurricane Katrina

References

Andrew Met
Andrew
Hurricane Andrew